Kenyon is a masculine given name, which may refer to:

Kenyon Coleman (born 1979), American former National Football League player
Kenyon Cox (1856–1919), American painter, illustrator, muralist, writer and teacher
Kenyon Clutter, murdered in 1959, written about in Truman Capote's novel In Cold Blood
Kenyon Green (born 2001), American football player
Kenyon Hopkins (1912–1983), American film composer
Kenyon Martin (born 1977), National Basketball Association player
Kenyon Martin Jr. (born 2001), American basketball player and son of Kenyon
Kenyon Nicholson (1894–1986), American playwright and screenwriter
Kenyon Painter (1867–1940), American banker, big game hunter, art collector and philanthropist
Kenyon Peard (1902–1994), British Royal Navy rear-admiral
Kenyon Rasheed (born 1970), American former National Football League player
Kenyon Vaughan-Morgan (1873–1933), British lieutenant-colonel and politician

English-language masculine given names